Ağzıkara Han is a historic Seljuk-era caravanserai in Turkey. It is located in the Ağzıkarahan village in the province of Aksaray.

History 
The caravanserai is considered one of the most important and richly-decorated examples of ordinary caravanserais built by non-royal patrons. Foundation inscriptions attest that the covered/roofed section of the building was completed in June 1231 during the reign of Sultan Ala ad-Din Kayqubad I, while the courtyard was completed in February 1240 during the reign of his successor Kaykhusraw II. The patron who commissioned the construction was named Mes’ud, son of Abdullah.

Architecture 
Like other major caravanserais of this period, it consists of two sections: one centered around a main courtyard, and an indoors section. The caravanserai is entered via a monumental entrance portal (pishtaq) projecting from the plain exterior walls of the building, with stone-carved decoration and a vaulted canopy of muqarnas. It leads to the main courtyard, around which are numerous chambers. In the middle of the courtyard is a small mosque consisting of a square stone chamber raised on four pillars and reached by stairs, considered an excellent example of this feature (which recurs in other caravanserais). The indoors section consists of a vaulted nave with a central dome (though the dome itself has been lost), from which vaulted chambers open on either side.

References 

Buildings and structures completed in the 13th century
Buildings and structures in Aksaray Province
Buildings and structures of the Sultanate of Rum
Caravanserais in Turkey
History of Aksaray Province
Seljuk architecture